Doria or Dória may refer to:

People

Surname
 Doria (family), a prominent Genoese family
 Andrea Doria (1466–1560), Genoese admiral
 Ansaldo Doria, 12th century Genoese statesman and commander
 Brancaleone Doria (died c. 1409?), husband of Brancaleone Doria and conqueror of most of Sardinia
 Giovanni Doria (bishop) (1573–1642), Roman Catholic cardinal and Archbishop of Palermo
 Giovanni Andrea Doria (1539–1606), Italian admiral also known as Gianandrea Doria
 Giovanni Battista Doria (1470–1554), Doge of the Republic of Genoa
 Giovanni Carlo Doria (1576–1625), Genoese art collector
 Lamba Doria (1245–1323), Genoese admiral
 Marco Doria, Marquis and Count of Montaldeo (born 1957), Italian academic and politician, former mayor of Genoa
 Oberto Doria (died 1306), Genoese politician and admiral
 Paganino Doria, 14th century Genoese admiral
 Perceval Doria] (c. 1195–1264), Genoese naval and military leader
 Simon Doria (fl. 1250–1293), Genoese statesman and man of letters
 Simone Doria (admiral) (c. 1135–?), Genoese merchant, politician and admiral
 Sinibaldo Doria (1664–1733), archbishop and cardinal
 Armand Doria (1824–1896), French count, art collector and patron
 Giacomo Doria (1840–1913), Italian naturalist, herpetologist, and politician
 João Doria (born 1957), Brazilian politician
 Jorge Dória (1920–2013), Brazilian actor and humourist
 Palmério Dória (born 1948), Brazilian journalist and writer

Mononym and given name
 Dória (Matheus Dória Macedo, born 1994), Brazilian footballer for Olympique de Marseille and Brazil
 Doria Ragland, American social worker, yoga instructor, and mother of Meghan, Duchess of Sussex
 Doria Shafik, Egyptian feminist
 Doria Tillier (born 1986) French actress

Other uses
 Doria (food), a Japanese dish similar to gratin but with a rice base
 Doria (opera), a French opera based on life of Andrea Doria by composer Étienne Méhul that premiered in 1795
 Doria, a synonym for the fly genus Compsilura
 Hurricane Doria, a 1967 Atlantic Ocean tropical cyclone
 Tropical Storm Doria, a 1971 Atlantic Ocean tropical cyclone

See also 
 Dorian (disambiguation)
 Dorriyeh, a village in Syria